The Academy of the Kingdom of Morocco (in Arabic : أكاديمية المملكة المغربية ; in amazigh : ⵜⴰⴳⴰⴷⵉⵎⵉⵢⵜ ⵏ ⵜⴳⵍⴷⵉⵜ ⵏ ⵍⵎⵖⵔⵉⴱ) is a scholarly national academy based in Rabat. The site of the academy, located along Avenue Mohammed VI, south of Rabat, is adjoining that of the other Moroccan academic institution: the Hassan II Academy of Sciences and Technologies, specialized in exact, natural and technical sciences.

The academy has sixty members: thirty resident members, of Moroccan nationality, and thirty associate members, of other nationalities.

In 2021, the Academy of the Kingdom of Morocco was reorganized by law n° 74-19 promulgated by dahir n° 1-21-02 of February 5, 2021. It now includes three institutes: the Higher Academic Authority for Translation; the Academic Arts' Institute and the Royal Institute of Research on the History of Morocco.

Structure 

Since 2015, the perpetual secretary of the academy is Abdeljalil Lahjomri, who is also the director of the Royal College.

Members

References

External links 

 Homepage

Organizations based in Rabat
Organizations established in 1992
Scientific organizations based in Morocco
Academy of the Kingdom of Morocco